Wickes is a ghost town in Jefferson County, Montana, United States.

References

External links
Photos of Wickes, Montana on Ghost Town Gallery

Unincorporated communities in Jefferson County, Montana
Ghost towns in Montana
Mining communities in Montana
Company towns in Montana
Unincorporated communities in Montana